Fighting Hero is a 1934 American Western film directed by Harry S. Webb and starring Tom Tyler, Renee Borden, and Edward Hearn.

Main cast
 Tom Tyler as Tom Hall  
 Renee Borden as Conchita Alvarez  
 Edward Hearn as Bert Hawley  
 Dick Botiller as Dick 
 Ralph Lewis as The Judge  
 Murdock MacQuarrie as Prosecutor  
 Nelson McDowell as Bailiff  
 Tom London as Sheriff  
 George Chesebro as Deputy  
 Rosa Rosanova as Aunt  
 J.P. McGowan as Morales

References

Bibliography
 Pitts, Michael R. Poverty Row Studios, 1929–1940: An Illustrated History of 55 Independent Film Companies, with a Filmography for Each. McFarland & Company, 2005.

External links
 

1934 films
1934 Western (genre) films
1930s English-language films
American Western (genre) films
Films directed by Harry S. Webb
Reliable Pictures films
American black-and-white films
1930s American films